The 1998 WNBA season was the first for the Detroit Shock. The team had an 0–4 start, but by season's end they missed out on a postseason berth by just one game in the standings.

Offseason
On January 27, 1998, a total of 4 players were assigned to two teams in no particular order.  
On February 18, 1998, a WNBA expansion draft took place
On April 28, 1998, the regular WNBA draft took place.

Initial Player Allocation

Expansion Draft

WNBA Draft

Regular season

Season standings

Season Schedule

Player stats
Note: GP= Games played; FG = Field Goals; MIN= Minutes; REB= Rebounds; AST= Assists; STL = Steals; BLK = Blocks; PTS = Points

References

External links 
Shock on Basketball Reference

Detroit Shock seasons
Detroit
Detroit Shock